is a railway station in the town of Kawanehon, Haibara District, Shizuoka Prefecture, Japan, operated by the Ōigawa Railway.

Lines
Senzu Station is the terminal station for both the 39.5 kilometer Ōigawa Main Line and the 25.5 kilometer Ikawa Line.

Station layout
The station has a bay platform for six tracks, only two of which are in regular use. The station building is also a local department store. The station retains a manually operated Ransomes & Rapier turntable for use by the line's steam locomotives. The station also maintains a small museum pertaining to the line's steam locomotive operations. The station is attended.

Adjacent stations

|-
!colspan=5|Ōigawa Railway

Station history
Senzu Station was one of the original stations of the Ōigawa Main Line, and was opened on December 1, 1931.

Passenger statistics
In fiscal 2017, the station was used by an average of 573 passengers daily (boarding passengers only).

Surrounding area
Kawanehon Junior High School
Kahanehon Elementary School
Japan National Route 362

See also
 List of Railway Stations in Japan

References

External links

 Ōigawa Railway home page

Stations of Ōigawa Railway
Railway stations in Shizuoka Prefecture
Railway stations in Japan opened in 1931
Kawanehon, Shizuoka